Dennis Hubert Chitty  (18 September 1912 – 3 February 2010), was a professor of zoology at the University of British Columbia. In 1969, he was elected a Fellow of the Royal Society of Canada.

The Chitty Hypothesis of Population Regulation states that population density is limited by spacing behaviour, which has genetic underpinnings and rapidly responds to natural selection. Because of the controversial nature of this idea at the time, David Lack attempted to veto Chitty's dissertation, though it was eventually accepted because of the intervention of Peter Medawar.

References

1912 births
2010 deaths
Canadian zoologists
Canadian ecologists
Fellows of the Royal Society of Canada
Academic staff of the University of British Columbia
University of Toronto alumni
Alumni of the University of Oxford
British emigrants to Canada